is a private university in Saeki-ku, Hiroshima, Japan. It was established by Tsuru Gakuen (founded by Noboru Tsuru) in 1961 as a two-year college, and became a four-year university in 1963, taking its present name.

The university has faculties of engineering, applied information science, and environmental studies.

The university also offers a study abroad program for students at the University of Illinois at Urbana-Champaign and Trinity Western University.

References

External links
 

Private universities and colleges in Japan
Hiroshima
Universities and colleges in Hiroshima Prefecture
Engineering universities and colleges in Japan